Valeriia Liulko (born September 18, 1999, Luhansk) is a Ukrainian diver, medalist of the European Championships. She won a bronze medal in the 10-meter platform synchro diving at the 2017 European Diving Championships in Kyiv. Her partner was Sofiia Lyskun.

References 

1999 births
Sportspeople from Luhansk
Ukrainian female divers
Living people
European Games competitors for Ukraine
Divers at the 2015 European Games
21st-century Ukrainian women